Sri Karan Narendra Agriculture University (SKNAU) is an agricultural university situated in Jobner, Rajasthan, India. It was established in 2013  by the Government of Rajasthan under Agriculture University, Jobner Act, 2013. Its jurisdiction covers eight districts, namely Ajmer, Alwar, Bharatpur, Dausa, Dholpur, Jaipur, Sikar and Tonk. Jeet Singh Sandhu was appointed vice chancellor in 2019.

Constituent colleges
The university has the following Constituent colleges:

SKN College of Agriculture, Jobner
SKN College of Agri-Business Management, Jobner
College of Agriculture, Lalsot
College of Agriculture, Bharatpur
College of Agriculture, Fatehpur
College of Agriculture, Navgaon, Alwar
College of Agriculture, Basedi, Dholpur
College of Agriculture, Kotputli

References

External links

Universities in Rajasthan
Educational institutions established in 2013
2013 establishments in Rajasthan
Agricultural universities and colleges in Rajasthan
Jaipur district